McCarter is a surname of Scottish and Irish origin. Notable people with the surname include:

Andre McCarter (born 1953), American basketball player
Billy McCarter (born 1888), Australian rules footballer who played for Geelong in the VFL
Brooke McCarter (1963–2015), American musician and actor 
Ian mcCarter (1968-present),owner of many businesses in the past
Gordon McCarter (1931–2002), American football official in the National Football League (NFL)
Harold McCarter Taylor (1907–1995), New Zealand-born British mathematician, theoretical physicist and historian of architecture
Kyle McCarter (born 1962), Republican member of the Illinois Senate, representing the 51st district since February 2009
Lloyd G. McCarter (1917–1956), Private in the 503rd Parachute Infantry Regiment of the United States Army, awarded the Medal of Honor
Layla McCarter (born 1979), American professional boxer
Margaret Hill McCarter (1860–1938), American schoolteacher and novelist
Robert H. McCarter (1859–1941), American lawyer who served as the Attorney General of New Jersey
Thomas N. McCarter (1867–1955), American lawyer who served as the Attorney General of New Jersey
Willie McCarter (born 1946), retired American basketball player

See also
14463 McCarter, main-belt asteroid
McArtor
McCarter & English, law firm in New Jersey, United States
McCarter Theatre, not-for-profit, professional company on the campus of Princeton University in Princeton, New Jersey
Tyson McCarter Place, homestead located in the Great Smoky Mountains of Sevier County, in the U.S. state of Tennessee

References